James or Jim Gordon may refer to:

Arts and entertainment
 James Gordon (actor) (1871–1941), American actor
 Jim Gordon (sportscaster) (1927–2003), American sportscaster
 James Alexander Gordon (1936–2014), British radio presenter
 Jim Gordon (musician) (1945–2023), American rock drummer
 James Gordon (Canadian musician) (born 1955), Canadian singer-songwriter
 James Gordon (journalist), British broadcast journalist and radio presenter
 Jim Gordon (bassist), bassist on Sordid Humor
 Jim Gordon (jazz musician), on Home Plate

Military 
 James Gordon, 2nd Viscount Aboyne (1620–1649), Scottish royalist commander in the Wars of the Three Kingdoms
 James Willoughby Gordon (1772–1851), British Army general and long-serving Quartermaster-General to the Forces
 James Gordon (Royal Navy officer) (1782–1869), British admiral
 James Gordon (British Army officer, died 1783), British Army officer who fought in the American War of Independence
 James B. Gordon (1822–1864), Confederate general
 James Gordon (Australian soldier) (1909–1986), awarded the Victoria Cross in 1941
 James Gordon (British Army officer, born 1957), British Army general

Politics and law 
 James Gordon (New York politician) (1739–1810), American Indian trader, U.S. Congressman
 James Gordon (MP) (c. 1758–1822), Member of Parliament for Stockbridge, Truro, Clitheroe and Tregony
 James Gordon (Upper Canada politician) (1786–1865), Upper Canada political figure
 James Wright Gordon (J. Wright Gordon, 1809–1853), Whig politician from Michigan
 James Lindsay Gordon (1813–1877) attorney and member of the Virginia House of Delegates
 James Gordon (Mississippi politician) (1833–1912), American planter, U.S. Senator
 James Gordon (Australian politician) (1845–1914), New South Wales politician
 James L. Gordon (1917–1967), American-Filipino politician
 James Fleming Gordon (1918–1990), U.S. federal judge
 James Lindsay Gordon (attorney) (1858–1904), American attorney and Virginia state senator, nephew of James Lindsay Gordon
 James Thomas Gordon (1859–1919), Canadian politician, Manitoba
 Jim Gordon (politician) (born 1937), Canadian politician
 James Gordon (New Brunswick politician) (born 1949), Canadian former politician
 James D. Gordon III (born 1954), American legal academic
 Jim Gordon (American politician), American educator and politician

Religion
 James Gordon (Jesuit) (1541–1620), Scottish Jesuit
 James Gordon (vicar apostolic) (1665–1746), Vicar Apostolic of Scotland
 James Frederick Skinner Gordon (1821–1904), Scottish antiquary and Episcopal church minister
 James Gordon (missionary) (1832–1872), Scottish missionary to the New Hebrides
 James Henry Hamilton-Gordon (1845–1868), prospective missionary, son of George Hamilton-Gordon, 5th Earl of Aberdeen
 James Gordon (bishop of Jarrow) (1881–1938), Bishop of Jarrow in the Church of England

Other people

 James Gordon (botanist) (1708–1780), gardener, nurseryman and seed merchant
 James Davidson Gordon (1835–1889), British civil servant and administrator
 James Edward Henry Gordon (1852–1893), British engineer
 James Riely Gordon (1863–1937), American architect
 James Gordon (athlete) (1908–1997), American Olympic sprinter
 J. E. Gordon (James Edward Gordon, 1913–1998), British professor of materials science and biomechanics
 James P. Gordon (1928–2013), American physicist and engineer
 James Gordon, Baron Gordon of Strathblane (1936–2020), Scottish businessman
 James Gordon (American football) (born 1991), American football player
 James Samuel Gordon, American author and psychiatrist

Fictional people

James Gordon (character), fictional police commissioner of Gotham City in Batman comics
 James Gordon Jr., a fictional supervillain in DC Comics and an enemy of Batman
 James Gordon (Gotham), a fictional character in the Gotham television series, based on the Batman character of the same name

See also
Jay Gordon (disambiguation)
Jimmy Gordon (disambiguation)